Redmoor is a hamlet in Cornwall, England, United Kingdom.

Geography
The nature reserve and Site of Special Scientific Interest of Red Moor lies directly west of the hamlet.

References

Hamlets in Cornwall